

Champions
World Series: New York Yankees over St. Louis Cardinals (4–0)

Awards and honors
League Award
 Mickey Cochrane, Philadelphia Athletics, C
 Jim Bottomley, St. Louis Cardinals, 1B

Statistical leaders

Major league baseball final standings

American League final standings

National League final standings

Negro leagues final standings

Negro National League final standings

St. Louis won the first half, Chicago won the second half.
St. Louis beat Chicago 5 games to 4 games in a play-off.

Eastern Colored League final standings

The League broke up midway through the season due to the breakdown of the founder (and manager of Hilldale) although the individual teams continued to play.

Events
January 10 – The New York Giants trade Rogers Hornsby to the Boston Braves for Shanty Hogan and Jimmy Welsh.
April 1 – Kansas City (American Association) purchases Joe Cronin's contract from the Pittsburgh Pirates.
April 10 – In the season opener, the Boston Red Sox defeat the Washington Senators, 7–5.
April 13 – The contest between the Cleveland Indians and Chicago White Sox is called a 1–1 tie after six innings.
May 19 – With a 3–2 victory over the Boston Braves, the Chicago Cubs complete a thirteen-game winning streak.
June 16 – At Comiskey Park, Boston Red Sox second baseman Bill Regan hits two home runs in the fourth inning during a 10–5 victory over the Chicago White Sox. Regan matches his last year's total in the inning. His first homer is off loser Ted Blankenship, and the second is an inside-the-park-off Sarge Connally. Ellis Burks will be the second player in Red Sox history to hit a pair of homers in an inning, on August 27, . Rookie Ed Morris is the winning pitcher.
July 26
Hall of Famer Carl Hubbell gives up five runs (three earned) and seven hits, and takes the loss in his first major league start.
Bob Meusel of the New York Yankees hit for the cycle for the third time in his career. The Yankees scored 11 runs in the top of the 12th inning to beat the Detroit Tigers, 12–1.
July 30 – The Philadelphia Phillies defeat the St. Louis Cardinals 8–7 in sixteen innings. Hall of famer Chuck Klein makes his major league debut.
August 6 – For the second time in four days, the New York Yankees lose a fifteen inning game.
August 15 – Hall of Fame catcher Bill Dickey makes his major league debut in the Yankees' 8–4 loss to the Chicago White Sox.
September 9 – With first place in the American League on the line, the New York Yankees sweep a double header from the Philadelphia Athletics.
September 24 - A Monday afternoon crowd of only 404 watches the Detroit Tigers blank the last place Boston Red Sox 8–0. The meager number of fans at Navin Field is the lowest attendance in American League history at Detroit.
September 25 – The Philadelphia Phillies snap a twelve-game losing streak with a 5–2 victory over the Chicago Cubs. It is Philadelphia's second twelve-game losing streak of the season (July 7 to July 20).
October 4 – A seventh-inning solo home run by Jim Bottomley is one of only three hits for the St. Louis Cardinals as the New York Yankees take game one of the 1928 World Series, 4–1.
October 5 – Lou Gehrig has five RBIs, including a first-inning three-run home run to lead the New York Yankees to a 9–3 victory in game two of the World Series.
October 7 – Lou Gehrig hits two home runs, including an inside-the-park home run in the fourth in the Yankees' 7–3 victory in game three of the World Series.
October 9 – The New York Yankees defeat the St. Louis Cardinals, 7–3, in Game four of the World Series to win their third World Championship title. Babe Ruth hits three home runs in Game four. This is the second time in three years Ruth hits three home runs in a Series game.
November 7 – The Boston Braves send Rogers Hornsby to the Chicago Cubs for Bruce Cunningham, Percy Jones, Lou Legett, Freddie Maguire, Socks Seibold and $200,000.
December 1 – National League President John Heydler becomes the first person to propose a baseball rule change calling for a 10th man, or a designated hitter, to bat in place of the pitcher. The NL will vote in favor of the proposal, but the American League will turn it down.
December 2 – St. Louis Cardinals first baseman Jim Bottomley, who hit 325 with 31 home runs and 126 RBI, is elected National League Most Valuable Player with 76 points for 70 of Freddie Lindstrom, whose .358 batting average was third behind Rogers Hornsby (.387) and Paul Waner (.370).
December 19 – The Washington Senators trade Hall of fame second baseman Bucky Harris to the Detroit Tigers for Jack Warner.

Births

January
January 5 – Dorothy Naum
January 5 – Bob Oldis
January 6 – Dan Lewandowski
January 10 – Jack Dittmer
January 11 – Loren Babe
January 11 – Carl Powis
January 23 – Chico Carrasquel
January 28 – Pete Runnels
January 29 – Jim Robertson
January 31 – Rhoda Leonard

February
February 5 – Don Hoak
February 6 – Charlie Gorin
February 7 – Joe Lonnett
February 7 – Felipe Montemayor
February 7 – Al Smith
February 9 – Erv Palica
February 11 – Chris Kitsos
February 20 – Roy Face
February 24 – Bubba Phillips
February 27 – Juan Delis
February 28 – Dick Kokos
February 28 – Therese McKinley

March
March 1 – Bert Hamric
March 13 – Bob Greenwood
March 14 – Earl Smith
March 15 – Paul Carey
March 15 – Nellie King
March 18 – Chi-Chi Olivo
March 20 – Jake Crawford
March 22 – Paul Schramka
March 23 – Charlene Barnett
March 23 – Jim Lemon

April
April 4 – Frank Smith
April 10 – Frankie Pack
April 12 – Bill Stewart
April 14 – Herb Adams
April 28 – Rinty Monahan

May
May 9 – Jean Smith
May 11 – Vern Rapp
May 11 – Mel Wright
May 13 – Bob Smith
May 15 – Betty Warfel
May 16 – Billy Martin
May 19 – Gil McDougald
May 21 – Elmer Sexauer
May 24 – Donna Cook
May 29 – Willard Schmidt

June
June 3 – Dick Young
June 4 – Billy Hunter
June 6 – Bob Talbot
June 7 – Marilyn Olinger
June 8 – Aldine Calacurcio
June 8 – Webbo Clarke
June 8 – Alex Konikowski
June 10 – Ken Lehman
June 12 – Jack Cusick
June 14 – Herb Plews
June 17 – Willard Nixon
June 20 – Bob Mahoney
June 20 – Art Schult
June 23 – Jean Cione
June 25 – Gloria Ruiz
June 29 – Nick Testa
June 29 – Gene Verble
June 30 – Pompeyo Davalillo

July
July 1 – Hersh Freeman
July 4 – Babe Birrer
July 4 – Chuck Tanner
July 5 – Jim Baxes
July 5 – Lorraine Fisher
July 5 – Georgette Vincent
July 10 – John Glenn
July 13 – Daryl Spencer
July 15 – Julián Ladera
July 18 – Billy Harrell
July 22 – Stu Locklin
July 23 – José Bracho
July 27 – Charlie Bicknell
July 29 – Ken Landenberger
July 30 – Bill Hall
July 30 – Joe Nuxhall

August
August 3 – Dick Hyde
August 3 – Cliff Ross
August 6 – Herb Moford
August 8 – Vern Morgan
August 8 – Jane Stoll
August 11 – Bob Stephenson
August 12 – Bob Buhl
August 18 – Marge Schott
August 19 – Jim Finigan
August 24 – Hal Griggs
August 25 – Darrell Johnson
August 25 – Floyd Wooldridge
August 28 – Betty Wanless
August 30 – Doris Neal
August 31 – Buzz Dozier

September
September 4 – José Santiago
September 10 – Bob Garber
September 12 – Len Matarazzo
September 15 – Bob Lennon
September 16 – Vito Valentinetti
September 17 – Ed Vargo
September 23 – Corinne Clark
September 26 – Al Lary
September 27 – Perry Currin
September 27 – Thornton Kipper
September 28 – Dick Gernert

October
October 1 – Hal Naragon
October 2 – Angel Scull
October 3 – Dave Melton
October 4 – Rip Repulski
October 6 – Fred Marolewski
October 7 – Joe Presko
October 13 – Walter Lee Gibbons
October 15 – Jim Command
October 15 – Gail Henley
October 16 – Len Yochim
October 17 – Jim Gilliam
October 20 – Mickey Micelotta
October 21 – Whitey Ford
October 24 – George Bullard
October 27 – Alice Hoover
October 31 – Janet Jacobs

November
November 2 – Shirley Kleinhans
November 2 – Bob Ross
November 4 – Jay Van Noy
November 4 – Edna Scheer
November 6 – Bill Wilson
November 13 – Steve Bilko
November 15 – Gus Bell
November 15 – Normie Roy
November 16 – Jacqueline Mattson
November 18 – Lou Lombardo
November 25 – Ray Narleski
November 28 – Billy Queen
November 29 – Bill Currie

December
December 5 – Mary Dailey
December 5 – Jack Urban
December 9 – Joe DeMaestri
December 9 – Billy Klaus
December 11 – Harry Warner
December 13 – Joe Landrum
December 15 – Clyde McNeal
December 16 – Doug Hansen
December 17 – Dolores Wilson
December 25 – Frank Baldwin
December 25 – Mike Blyzka

Deaths

January
January 2 – James D. Burns, 62, founding owner of the Detroit Tigers from their entry into the American League in 1901 through the 1902 season.
January 2 – Hunkey Hines, 60, right fielder in two games for the 1895 Brooklyn Grooms of the National League.
January 14 – Al Reach, 87, Anglo-American sportsman who as second baseman became the first professional player in 1865; batted .353 for 1871 champion Athletics in first season of National Association; co-founder of the Phillies, serving as team president from 1883 to 1902, later part owner of Athletics; publisher of annual baseball guides beginning in 1883, and also was responsible for the invention of the cork-center baseball.
January 16 – Claude Rossman, 46, American League first baseman/right fielder who played with the Cleveland Naps, Detroit Tigers and St. Louis Browns in parts of five seasons spanning 1904–09.
January 28 – Jake Thielman, 48, pitcher for the St. Louis Browns, Cleveland Naps and Boston Red Sox of the American League between 1905 and 1908.
January 30 – Jim Foran, 80, first baseman for the 1871 Fort Wayne Kekiongas of the National Association.

February
February [?] – Pablo Mesa, 30, Negro league outfielder/pitcher for the Cuban Stars (East) from 1921 through 1927.
February 1 – Hughie Jennings, 58, Hall of Fame shortstop, most notably for the Baltimore Orioles of the National League, who batted .311 lifetime but had career shortened by numerous beanings, who as team captain was runnerup in 1896 batting race with .401 mark, managed the Detroit Tigers to consecutive pennants from 1907 to 1909, and later coached for the New York Giants.
February 4 – Bill McCarthy, 41, backup catcher for the 1905 Boston Beaneaters and 1907 Cincinnati Reds of the National League.
February 9 – Bill Farmer, 63, Irish catcher/outfielder for the NL Pittsburgh Alleghenys and the AA Philadelphia Athletics in 1888.
February 13 – Pete Daniels, 63, pitcher for the 1890 Pittsburgh Alleghenys and 1898 St. Louis Browns of the National League.
February 23 – Jack Ridgway, 39, pitcher for the 1914 Baltimore Terrapins of the Federal League.
February 27 – Walt Schulz, 27, pitcher for the 1920 St. Louis Cardinals of the National League.

March
March 5 – Mart McQuaid, 66, backup second baseman/outfielder for the 1891 St. Louis Browns of the American Association and the 1898 Washington Senators of the National League.
March 13 – Bobby Wheelock, 63, shortstop/outfielder for the NL Boston Beaneaters and the AA Columbus Solons in parts of three seasons spanning 1887–91.
March 14 – Nat Hudson, 69, pitcher for the St. Louis Browns of the American Association from 1886 through 1889, who helped his team win the 1886 World Series over the National League's Chicago White Stockings, and posted a 25–10 record with a 2.54 ERA and a top-league .714 winning percentage in 1888.
March 19 – Tom Lovett, 64, pitcher for six seasons between 1885 and 1894, mainly with the NL Brooklyn Bridegrooms, who collected 30 wins in 1890 and hurled a no-hitter against the New York Giants in 1891.
March 23 – Jake Kafora, 39, backup catcher for the NL Pittsburgh Pirates from 1913 to 1914.
March 25 – Homer Smoot, 50, center fielder who batted a .290 average in 680 games with the St. Louis Cardinals and Cincinnati Reds from 1902 to 1906, and led all National League outfielders with 284 putouts in 1902.

April
April 1 – Marr Phillips, 70, shortstop who played in parts of three seasons spanning 1884–90 with the Indianapolis Hoosiers, Pittsburgh Alleghenys and Rochester Broncos of the American Association, and for the Detroit Wolverines of the National League.
April 6 – Ike McAuley, 36, National League shortstop for the Pittsburgh Pirates (1914–16), St. Louis Cardinals (1917) and Chicago Cubs (1925).
April 19 – Harry McCaffery, 69, outfield/infield utility for the St. Louis Brown Stockings/Browns and Louisville Eclipse of the American Association from 1882 to 1883.
April 23 – Joe Miller, 67, shortstop for the 1884 Toledo Blue Stockings and the 1885 Louisville Colonels of the American Association.
April 24 – Harry Berthrong, 84, infield/outfield utility and catcher in 17 games with the 1871 Washington Olympics of the National Association.
April 26 – Zeke Wilson, 58, pitcher from 1895 through 1899 for the Boston Beaneaters, Cleveland Spiders and St. Louis Perfectos of the National League.

May
May 1 – Bull Smith, 47, outfielder for the Pittsburgh Pirates, Chicago Cubs and Washington Senators between the 1904 and 1911 seasons.
May 6 – Sam Wright, 79, younger brother of Hall of Famers Harry and George Wright, who played at shortstop for the New Haven Elm Citys, Boston Red Stockings and Cincinnati Reds in parts of four seasons spanning 1875–81.
May 10 – Ed Stein, 58, pitcher who played from 1890 through 1898 for the Chicago Colts and Brooklyn Grooms/Bridegrooms of the National League.
May 24 – Billy Smith, 67, pitcher for the 1886 Detroit Wolverines of the National League.
May 25 – Max Fiske, 39, pitcher for the 1914 Chicago Chi-Feds of the outlaw Federal League.
May 31 – Grant Briggs, 63, part-time catcher/outfielder in 110 games with the Syracuse Stars, Louisville Colonels and St. Louis Browns between 1890 and 1895.

June
June 1 – Charlie Jordan, 56, pitcher for the 1896 Philadelphia Phillies of the National League.
June 12 – Frank Wilson, 41, National League umpire who officiated in 996 games between April 13, 1921 and June 3, 1928; led NL arbiters in ejections in 1921–1922; died following appendicitis surgery nine days after working his last MLB game.
June 13 – Chuck Corgan, 25, backup middle infielder for the National League Brooklyn Robins in the 1925 and 1927 seasons.
June 14 – Con Daily, 63, catcher who also played all infield and outfield positions for seven teams in two different leagues, mainly for the Brooklyn Grooms of the National League, in a 12-year career that spanned from 1895 to 1996.
June 19 – Jake Weimer, 54, National League pitcher who posted a 97–69 record from 1903 to 1909 for the Cubs, Reds and New York Giants, including three 20-win seasons and a 2.23 career ERA in 143 complete games.
June 23 – Malachi Kittridge, 58, catcher for the Louisville Colonels, Boston Beaneaters, Washington Senators and Cleveland Naps between 1890 and 1906.
June 24 – Frank Cox, 70, shortstop in 26 games with the 1884 Detroit Wolverines of the National League.

July
July 2 – Pete Hotaling, 71, center fielder for six different teams in two leagues, primarily for the Cleveland Blues of the National League, during parts of nine seasons spanning 1879–88.
July 15 – Al Sauter, 59, third baseman for the 1890 for the Philadelphia Athletics of the American Association.
July 18 – Ed Killian, 51, pitcher who posted a 103–78 record and a 2.38 ERA in 214 games from 1903 to 1910, collecting two 20-win seasons,  allowing nine home runs in 1600 career innings (none from 1903 to 1907), while clinching the 1907 American League pennant for the Detroit Tigers with two wins in a doubleheader.
July 30 – Charlie Becker, 37, pitcher from 1911 to 1912 for the Washington Senators of the American League.

August
August 21 – Joe Mulvey, 69, third baseman who played from 1883 to 1895 for seven teams in three different league, including four Philadelphia franchises, collecting 1059 hits in 4063 at-bats for a .261 average in 987 games.
August 25 – Snake Wiltse, 56, pitcher/first baseman/outfielder for the Pittsburgh Pirates, Philadelphia Athletics, Baltimore Orioles and New York Highlanders from 1901 through 1903, who posted a 29–31 record and a 4.59 ERA in 68 games pitched, while batting a .278 average with a .398 of slugging in 86 games.

September
September 9 – Urban Shocker, 38, American League pitcher who posted a 187–117 record and a 3.17 ERA in 187 games with the St. Louis Browns and New York Yankees from 1916 to 1928, leading the league in wins (27) in 1921 and for the most strikeouts (149) in 1922, ending his career with four 20-win seasons and a 1.50 SO/BB ratio in 2681 innings.

October
October 10 – Justus Thorner, 80, owner of three different teams in Cincinnati, including the Cincinnati Red Stockings of 1882 and 1883, the inaugural seasons of the franchise now known as the Cincinnati Reds.
October 11 – Frank Smith, 70, Canadian catcher for the 1884 Pittsburgh Alleghenys of the National League.
October 14 – Billy Milligan, 60, pitcher for the 1901 Philadelphia Athletics (AL) and the 1904 New York Giants (NL).
October 14 – Bill Stuart, 55, middle infielder who played in part of two seasons for the Pittsburgh Pirates (1895) and New York Giants (1899) of the National League.
October 15 – Pony Sager, 80, shortstop/left fielder in eight games for the 1871 Rockford Forest Citys of the National Association.
October 22 – Jack Dunn, 56, major league pitcher/third baseman for five teams from 1897 to 1904, who became owner and manager of minor league Baltimore Orioles in 1907, where he developed stars as Babe Ruth and Lefty Grove, while winning seven consecutive pennants from 1919 through 1925, ending his career as the second winningest manager in minor league history.
October 27 – Billy West, 75, National League second baseman who played for the 1874 Brooklyn Atlantics and the 1876 New York Mutuals.
October 31 – José Méndez, 41, generally regarded as one of the greatest players in Cuban baseball history, who was a star pitcher in the Negro leagues, primarily with the All Nations team and the Kansas City Monarchs, while managing the Monarchs from 1920 to 1926, leading them to the first ever Negro World Series title in 1924.

November
November 4 – Ed Kelly, 39, relief pitcher for the 1914 Boston Red Sox of the American League.
November 5 – George Treadway, 61, National League outfielder from 1893 through 1896 for the Baltimore Orioles, Brooklyn Grooms and Louisville Colonels, who posted a .285 average and  a .432 of slugging in 328 career games.
November 6 – Bill Cooney, 45, relief pitcher from 1909 to 1910 for the Boston Doves of the National League.
November 11 – Oyster Burns, 64, right fielder for five teams between 1884 and 1895, primarily for the Brooklyn Bridegrooms, who led the National League in home runs (13) and RBI (128) in the 1887 season, while ending with a .300 batting average and a .445 slugging in 1188 career games.
November 14 – Herb Juul, 42, pitcher in one game for the 1911 Cincinnati Reds.
November 15 – Charlie Dorman, 30, backup catcher for the Chicago White Sox during the 1923 season.
November 15 – Horace Fogel, 67, owner and president of the Philadelphia Phillies from 1909 to 1912.
November 18 – Jim Gilmore, 75, catcher for the 1875 Washington Nationals of the National League.
November 21 – Pete Lohman, 64, catcher for the 1891 Washington Statesmen of the American Association.
November 26 – Denny Clare, 75, middle infielder for the 1872 Brooklyn Atlantics of the National Association.
November 26 – Butts Wagner, 57, the older brother of Honus Wagner, who played at third base and outfield for the Washington Senators and the Brooklyn Bridegrooms during the 1898 season.

December
December 2 – Bill Hugues, 68,  first baseman/outfielder and pitcher who played for the 1884 Washington Nationals of the Union Association and the 1885 Philadelphia Athletics of the American Association.
December 22 – Hugh Reid, 76, right fielder in one game for the 1874 Baltimore Canaries of the National Association.
December 27 – George Meister, 74,  third baseman for the 1884 Toledo Blue Stockings of the American Association.
December 29 – Mort Scanlan, 67, first baseman for the 1890 New York Giants of the National League.